The Father Ray Foundation is a charitable organisation located in the Thai resort town of Pattaya.

It currently cares for more than 850 underprivileged, orphaned, abused, neglected and abandoned children and students with disabilities.

History 

It was in 1974 that Father Ray Brennan C.Ss.R., an American priest of the Redemptorist order, first accepted an unwanted baby into his care.
That one act of kindness would be the start of a life of devotion to help the underprivileged in Thai society. He opened an orphanage, a pre-school facility for deaf toddlers, a vocational school for people with disabilities, a home for street kids and a school for blind children.

Father Ray died on the morning of 16 August 2003 and since then the Father Ray Foundation has continued his work in his vision and continues to live by its motto that 'we never turn a needy child away'.

Since 2003 the Father Ray Foundation has opened several new projects including a children's village, a drop-in center for street kids, a facility for children with special needs and a day care center for toddlers from the poorer slum areas of Pattaya.

Projects
The Father Ray Foundation helps children through the following projects:

Redemptorist Technological College for People with Disabilities – Pattaya
The School was opened in 1984 and offered part-time courses in Computer Science. 
It was in 1987 that the school accepted its first full-time students, offering free accommodation, food and medical help to young adults living with a disability.
Students study for three years and courses available include -
 Information Technology
 Electronic Repair
 Computer Business Management in English
 Elementary English 
Since the school opened its doors more than 2500 students have successfully graduated and are now able to, in the words of Father Ray, 'earn their own rice'.

Pattaya Redemptorist School for the Blind
Established in 1986, the purpose of the school is to give an education at primary and secondary levels to those children who are blind or severely partially sighted. In the first twenty five years since the school opened more than 400 students have graduated.

Father Ray Children's Village
Opened in 2008 the Children's Village is based on the SOS Children's Villages that were founded in 1949 to provide a home to children who had been orphaned during World War II.
Children live at the Father Ray Children's Village is houses with five to eight other children. They live as part of a family, with their new brother and sisters and the lady who will take care of them, cook for them, support them, love them and who they will call mother.
The aim of the Village is to provide assistance to under-privileged children who lack proper care from their own families. At the Village the children live in a safe environment, free from harm and with access to education, medical assistance and a nutritious diet. 
As in all programs where there is a family breakdown, it is the goal of the Father Ray Foundation to re-unite the family and assist them to maintain their family life.

The Father Ray Day Care Center
When the Father Ray Day Care Center opened in 2008 the aim was to provide kindergarten education for children from the poorer slum areas of Pattaya.

Children from the age of one to three spent their days in a safe environment while their parents are working or seeking work. No other organisation in the Pattaya area if offering care facilities to children of this age group. 
 
Father Ray School for Children with Special Needs
In 2007 a mother arrived seeking help for her son who is living with cerebral palsy. 
As word spread of the help that was on offer parents from all over the Pattaya area arrived, all seeking help for their child.

The center offers physiotherapy, occupational therapy and an education to the children while supporting the family and educating they in the condition their child is living with.

Food
The Father Ray Foundation provides nutritious meals to its children and students every day.

Rice, the staple food of Thailand, is served at almost every meal and more than 75,000 kg of rice are cooked each year.

On World Food Day, in mid October each year, the Father Ray Foundation appeals to the people of Pattaya to help feed the children and students.

During the annual SOS RICE Appeal, taking place each year over one weekend in early December, the children, students and foreign volunteers ask shoppers at all major supermarkets to buy and donate a bag of rice. 
Each year more than 10,000 kg of rice is donated and almost 1 million Baht in cash is donated to buy rice.

The Father Ray Foundation has several initiatives to become more self-sufficient in providing food.

At the Father Ray Children's Village the agriculture farm is providing fruits and vegetables, grown without pesticides.

At the Father Ray Children's Home the residents take care of two chicken houses, which between them are providing almost 500 eggs each day.

The children also take care of several mushroom huts. The children harvest the crop before washing, weighing and distributing the mushrooms to the Central Purchasing department. The mushrooms are also sold at local food markets.

Health

It is essential that all the children and students under the care of the Father Ray Foundation have access to medical assistance if they need it.
Each project managed by the Father Ray Foundation has a designated health care professional who is able to deal with any minor health problems that may occur. 
Serious injuries or ailments are treated at local hospitals.

Funders and supporters

The Father Ray Foundatibon receives support from the following organizations and companies:

 Rotary International
  Safe Child Thailand – U.K. and Ireland
 Redemptorist Apostolic Works |  – USA
  Les Amis de l'Orphelinat de Pattaya – France
 Thomas J. Vincent Foundation, Honolulu, Hawaii
 Den Danske Pattaya Fond – Denmark
 British Community in Thailand Foundation for the Needy – Bangkok
 Pattaya Sports Club

Volunteers
For many years the Father Ray Foundation has welcomed foreign volunteers who want to come and help improve the lives of the children and students of the Foundation.

Volunteers stay for a minimum of 6 months and work in the various projects. Work includes teaching English at the vocational school, helping the nannies at the Day Care Center and organising educational activities for the blind children.

On the weekends they teach English at the Children's Village while over at the Children's Home they organise arts & crafts, sports activities and provide English and Chinese lessons.

Accommodation and three meals each day is provided free of charge. However the volunteer must pay for their own flight, medical insurance and pocket money

Volunteers arrive in late April or in late October, ready for the new school terms

References 
 Father Ray Foundation official website

Children's charities based in Thailand